Zuna is a surname. Notable people with the surname include:

Frank Zuna (1893–1983), American long-distance runner
Pavel Zuna (born 1967), Czech journalist
Zuna (rapper) (born 1993), German rapper of Lebanese descent